William G. Plizka (born December 8, 1944) was a Republican politician and legislator from Wisconsin.

Born in Ashland, Wisconsin, Plizka graduated from Northland College in 1969. He served in the Wisconsin State Assembly for just one term. He was a former member of the local school board, as well as the Ashland County Board.

Notes

People from Ashland, Wisconsin
Northland College (Wisconsin) alumni
County supervisors in Wisconsin
School board members in Wisconsin
Republican Party members of the Wisconsin State Assembly
1944 births
Living people